Antonis Balomenakis (18 January 1954 – 3 January 2020), was a Greek politician and lawyer.

He was born on 18 January 1954 in Chania and studied law at the University of Athens. He was member of the Hellenic Parliament between elected in the 20 September 2015 elections, representing Chania constituency for SYRIZA, until 11 July 2019. He died on 3 January 2020 at the age of 65.

References

1954 births
2020 deaths
Syriza politicians
Greek MPs 2015–2019
20th-century Greek lawyers
National and Kapodistrian University of Athens alumni
Politicians from Chania